Crapolla is a natural fjord in the area of Torca, a frazione of Massa Lubrense in the province of Naples, Italy. It was once used as a natural port.

Nowadays a little fishermen's village can be seen, as well as St. Peter's Chapel (11th century), part of an abbey. Traces of ancient Roman dwellings can be seen in the area.

External links
http://www.crapolla.it

Sant'Agata Tourist Office website

Bodies of water of Italy
Landforms of Campania
Geography of the Metropolitan City of Naples
Fjords of Europe
Tourist attractions in Campania